Carolina Beatriz Ângelo (16 April 1878 – 3 October 1911) was a Portuguese physician and the first woman to vote in Portugal.

Life
Carolina Beatriz Ângelo was a medical doctor practising in Lisbon. She was a feminist and suffragette who participated in multiple women's associations. She was a leader of the Portuguese Women's Republican League and, in 1911, she and Adelaide Cabete founded the Portuguese Association of Feminist Propaganda (Associação de Propaganda Feminista) of which Ana de Castro Osório became the head.

Vote
On May 28, 1911 Ângelo cast her vote to elect representatives to the Constituent National Assembly in 1911 in the first elections after the fall of the monarchy. She used the ambiguity of the law, which granted the right to vote to literate head-of-households over 21, to cast her vote. As a widow and the mother of a daughter, she was a head-of-household. Shortly thereafter, on July 3, 1913, a law was passed to specify the right to vote was only for male citizens, literate and over 21. Her act was widely reported on throughout Portugal and among feminist associations in other countries.

Tribute 
On May 28, 2021, Google celebrated her with a Google Doodle.

Notes

1878 births
1911 deaths
Portuguese suffragists
Portuguese feminists
Portuguese women physicians